The 1991 Nobel Prize in Literature was awarded to the South African activist and writer Nadine Gordimer (1923–2014) "who through her magnificent epic writing has – in the words of Alfred Nobel – been of very great benefit to humanity." She is the 7th female and first South African recipient of the prize followed by J. M. Coetzee in 2003.

Laureate

During the 1960s and 1970s, Nadine Gordimer wrote a number of novels such as A World of Strangers (1958), Burger's Daughter (1979), and July's People (1981) which are set against the backdrop of the emerging resistance movement against apartheid, while the liberated South Africa provides the backdrop for her later works, written in the 1990s. The stories of individuals are always at the center of her narratives, in relation to external limitations and frameworks. Her 1974 novel The Conservationist which garnered numerous literary awards is considered to be her magnum opus. As a whole, Gordimer's literary works create rich imagery of South Africa's historical development. Her other well-known works include The Soft Voice of the Serpent (1952), My Son's Story (1990), and Get a Life (2005).

Reactions
Nadine Gordimer had been considered by the Swedish Academy for the Nobel Prize in Literature for many years and the choice was well received. In her home country it was celebrated by president F.W. de Klerk, saying "The Nobel Prize for literature is unequaled in prestige in the world. Winning it is a noteworthy achievement from any point of view", and by archbishop Desmond Tutu, saying "She's an outstanding artist, has a way with words but more than anything else she has had this tremendous commitment and caring about people, caring about justice".

References

External links
1991 Press release nobelprize.org
Award ceremony speech nobelprize.org

1991
Nadine Gordimer